Grove Township is one of sixteen townships in Cass County, Iowa, USA.  As of the 2000 census, its population was 7,608.

History
Grove Township was originally named Atlantic Township, until the fall of 1885 when it was renamed to Grove Township.
The name Atlantic Township continued to be used for the area within the boundaries of Atlantic city, while Grove Township lies outside the city.

Geography
According to the USGS, it contains two cemeteries: Atlantic and Southlawn Memorial Gardens.

References

External links
 US-Counties.com
 City-Data.com

Townships in Cass County, Iowa
Townships in Iowa